Balej is a surname. Notable people with the surname include:

 Jan Balej (born 1958), Czech animation artist, film director, and art designer
 Jan Balej (wrestler) (born 1893), Czech wrestler
 Jozef Balej (born 1982), Slovak ice hockey right winger